Yakov Mikhailovich Sverdlov (3 June [O. S. 22 May] 1885 – 16 March 1919) was a Bolshevik Party administrator and chairman of the All-Russian Central Executive Committee from 1917 to 1919. He is sometimes regarded as the first head of state of the Soviet Union, although it was not established until 1922, three years after his death.

Born in Nizhny Novgorod to a Jewish family active in revolutionary politics, Sverdlov joined the Russian Social Democratic Labour Party in 1902 and supported Vladimir Lenin's Bolshevik faction during an ideological split. He was active in the Urals during the failed Revolution of 1905, and in the next decade, he was subjected to constant imprisonment and exile. After the 1917 February Revolution overthrew the monarchy, Sverdlov returned to Petrograd and was appointed chairman of the Party Secretariat. In that capacity, he played a key role in planning of the October Revolution.

Sverdlov was elected chairman of the All-Russian Central Executive Committee in November 1917. He worked to consolidate Bolshevik control of the new regime and supported the Red Terror campaign and the decossackization policies. He is also considered to have played a major role in authorising the execution of the Romanov family in July 1918.

Sverdlov died in March 1919 during the Spanish flu at the age of 33 and was buried in the Kremlin Wall Necropolis. The city of Yekaterinburg was renamed Sverdlovsk in 1924 in his honour.

Early life

Sverdlov was born in Nizhny Novgorod as Yakov-Aaron Mikhailovich Sverdlov to Jewish parents, Mikhail Izrailevich Sverdlov and Elizaveta Solomonova. His father was a politically active engraver who produced forged documents and stored arms for the revolutionary underground. The Sverdlov family had six children: two daughters (Sophia and Sara) and four sons (Zinovy, Yakov, Veniamin, and Lev). After his wife's death in 1900, Mikhail converted with his family to the Russian Orthodox Church, married Maria Aleksandrovna Kormiltseva, and had two more sons, Herman and Alexander. Sverdlov's father was sympathetic to his children's socialist tendencies and 5 out of his 6 children would become involved in revolutionary politics at some point. Mikhail watched as his household slowly became a revolutionary hotspot, where the Novgorod Social Democrats would meet, write pamphlets, and even forge stamps for false passports. Yakov's eldest brother Zinovy was adopted by Maxim Gorky, who was a frequent guest at the house. Zinovy was the only Sverdlov to reject revolutionary politics and had little to no contact with Yakov after the revolution.

Yakov excelled at school, and after 4 years in gymnasium left to become a pharmacist's apprentice and a "professional revolutionary," Sverdlov joined the Russian Social Democratic Labour Party in 1902, and then later the Bolshevik faction, supporting Vladimir Lenin. 
In his youth, Sverdlov became friends with a fellow revolutionary Vladimir Lubotsky (later known as Zagorsky). He was involved in the 1905 revolution while living in the Ural Mountains. Though never actually attending college, Sverdlov adopted the garb of the radical students at the time – "With his medium height, unruly brown hair, glasses continually perched on his nose, and Tolstoy shirt worn under his jacket, Sverdlov looked like a student, and for us...a student meant a revolutionary."

Sverdlov became a major activist and speaker in Nizhny Novgorod. In 1906, Sverdlov was arrested and held in the Yekaterinburg prison until his release. During his time in prison, Sverdlov continued to educate himself and others, reading Lenin, Marx, Kautsky, Heine, and more. Sverdlov attempted to live by the motto: "I put books to the test of life, and life to the test of books." For most of the time from his arrest in June 1906 until 1917 he was either imprisoned or exiled. In March 1911, Sverdlov was held in the St. Petersburg House of Pretrial Detention. 

During the period 1914–1916 he was in internal exile in Turukhansk, Siberia, along with Joseph Stalin (then known as Dzhugashvili). Both had been betrayed by the Okhrana agent Roman Malinovsky. Of Stalin, Sverdlov wrote "The comrade I was with turned out to be such a person, socially, that we didn't talk or see each other. It was terrible." Like Stalin, he was co-opted in absentia to the 1912 Prague Conference. In 1914, Sverdlov moved to a different village, moving in with his friend Filipp Goloshchyokin, known as Georges. In early 1917, Sverdlov received news of the Putilov strike of 1917 in Petrograd. Alongside Goloshchyokin, he set out at once, arriving to Petrograd on 29 March 1917.

Party leader

After the 1917 February Revolution Sverdlov returned to Petrograd from exile as head of the Urals Delegation and found his way into Lenin's inner circle. He first met Lenin in April 1917 and subsequently usurped Elena Stasova as the chairman of the Central Committee Secretariat, and became the secretary of the Central Committee of the Party. According to Podvoisky, the chairperson of the Military Revolutionary Committee, "The person who did more than anyone to help Lenin with the practicalities of translating convictions into votes was Sverdlov." As chairman of the Central Committee, Yakov played an important role in planning the October Revolution and helped make the decision to stage an armed uprising. In November as the Bolsheviks debated whether to postpone or hold elections, Sverdlov advocated for immediate elections as promised. When the results came back showing that the Socialist Revolutionaries had won, Sverdlov, Lenin, and Bukharin dissolved the assembly, leading to a civil war.

Sverdlov is sometimes regarded as the first head of state of the Soviet Union, although it was not established until 1922, three years after his death. Sverdlov had a prodigious memory and was able to retain the names and details of fellow revolutionaries in exile. He promoted his friend and suite-mate Varlam Avanesov to second-in-command at the Central Executive Committee, and would later become a top official of the secret police. He also installed Vladimir Volodarsky as commissar of print, propaganda, and agitation until his assassination in 1918. His organizational capability was well-regarded, and during his chairmanship, thousands of local party committees were initiated. One of his comrades recalled that,

[He] could tell you everything you needed to know about a comrade: where he was working, what kind of person he was, what he was good at, and what job he should be assigned to in the interests of the cause and for his benefit. Moreover, Sverdlov had a very precise impression of all the comrades: they were so firmly stamped in his memory that he could tell you all about the company each one kept. It is hard to believe, but true. 

Sverdlov was elected chairman of the All-Russian Central Executive Committee in November 1917, of which his wife was also a part, becoming thereby de jure head of state of the Russian SFSR until his death. He played important roles in the decision in January 1918 to end the Russian Constituent Assembly and the subsequent signing on 3 March of the Treaty of Brest-Litovsk. In March 1918 Sverdlov along with most prominent Bolsheviks fled Petrograd and moved the government headquarters to Moscow – the Sverdlovs moved into a room in the Kremlin. 

In March 1918, Sverdlov and the Central Executive Committee discussed how to best remove the "ulcers that socialism has inherited from capitalism" and Yakov advocated for a concentrated effort to turn the poorest peasants in the villages against their kulak brethren. Alongside Bukharin, the party began a campaign of "concentrated violence" against many members of the landowning, capitalist, and tradesman classes of Russian society.

Romanov family

A number of sources claim that Sverdlov, alongside Lenin and Goloshchyokin, played a major role in the execution of Tsar Nicholas II and his family on 17 July 1918.

A book written in 1990 by the Moscow playwright Edvard Radzinsky claims that Sverdlov ordered their execution on 16 July 1918. This book and other Radzinsky books were characterized as "folk history" by journalists and academic historians. However Yuri Slezkine in his book The Jewish Century expressed a slightly different opinion: "Early in the Civil War, in June 1918, Lenin ordered the killing of Nicholas II and his family. Among the men entrusted with carrying out the orders were Sverdlov, Filipp Goloshchyokin and Yakov Yurovsky".

The 1922 book by a White Army general, Mikhail Diterikhs, The Murder of the Tsar's Family and members of the House of Romanov in the Urals, sought to portray the murder of the royal family as a Jewish plot against Russia. It referred to Sverdlov by his Jewish nickname "Yankel" and to Goloshchekin as "Isaac". This book in turn was based on an account by one Nikolai Sokolov, special investigator for the Omsk regional court, whom Diterikhs assigned with the task of investigating the disappearance of the Romanovs while serving as regional governor under the White regime during the Russian Civil War. The investigating magistrate in Ekaterinburg in 1918 saw the signed telegraphic instructions to execute the Imperial Family came from Sverdlov. These details were published in 1966. 

According to Leon Trotsky's diaries, after returning from the front (of the Russian Civil War) he had the following dialogue with Sverdlov:

Red Terror and decossackization 

Following the assassination of Moisei Uritsky and the assassination attempt on Lenin in August 1918, Sverdlov drafted a document that called for "merciless mass terror against all the enemies of the revolution". Under his and Lenin's leadership, the Central Executive Committee adopted Sverdlov's resolution calling for "mass red terror against the bourgeoisie and its agents." During Lenin's recovery Sverdlov moved into Lenin's office in the Kremlin and took over some of Lenin's official obligations. He oversaw the interrogation of Lenin's would-be assassin, Fanny Kaplan, and even moved Kaplan from the Cheka headquarters to be held in a basement room underneath Sverdlov's apartment. Sverdlov's deputy Avanesov gave the order for Kaplan's execution and Sverdlov himself personally ordered that the body be "destroyed without a trace." 

Sverdlov supported the Red Terror campaign, specifically when it came to the policy of decossackization that was started in 1917 as a part of the Russian Civil War. This policy resulted in the deaths of thousands of Cossacks, while the Soviet government confiscated land and food produced by the Cossack population. Sverdlov wrote that "not a single crime against the revolutionary military spirit will remain unpunished," and that the release of Cossack prisoners was unacceptable. This policy was temporarily suspended in March 1919 while Sverdlov was in Ukraine overseeing the election of the Ukrainian Communist Party's central committee.

Death

There are various theories on how he died and none can be proven officially such as poisoning, beating or flu. He is most commonly attributed to have died of either typhus or more likely the Spanish flu, after a political visit to the Ukraine and Oryol. Kremlin doctors diagnosed him with the Spanish flu. Even as his illness progressed, he continued to perform his duties as chairman of the Central Committee. On 14 March 1919 Sverdlov lost consciousness and on the 16th he died at the age of 33.

He is buried in the Kremlin Wall Necropolis in Moscow. Today his grave is one of the twelve individual tombs located between the Lenin Mausoleum and the Kremlin wall.

He was succeeded in an interim capacity by Mikhail Vladimirsky, and eventually by Mikhail Kalinin as Chairman of the Central Executive Committee, and by Elena Stasova as Chairwoman of the Secretariat.

Family 
Sverdlov was married to a meteorologist, Klavdia Novgorodtseva (1876–1960), who had joined the Bolsheviks in Yekaterinburg, her home town, in 1904, and was arrested for organising an illegal printing press. She and Sverdlov met after her release, and worked together during the 1905 revolution. In 1906, she represented the Perm Bolshevik at the Fourth RSDLP Congress in Stockholm. She was arrested again when she returned to Perm, and spent a year in prison. Released in 1910, she joined Sverdlov in St Petersburg, and was arrested again in 1910, but because of her pregnancy was sent back to Yekaterinburg. When she returned illegally to St Petersburg in 1912, she was arrested, held in a cell in her infant son, and deported to Siberia.   In 1915 Klavdia joined Yakov in exile in the village of Monastyrskoe, where together they ran a Bolshevik reading circle in the town, which, though illegal, escaped the notice of the local authorities. After the Bolshevik revolution, she worked with Sverdlov in the party secretariat. From 1920 until she retired in 1946, she worked in education, as a specialist in children's literature. 

Sverdlov and Novgorodtseva had had two children: a son Andrei, who joined the NKVD and became notorious for persecuting other children of eminent Old Bolsheviks, and daughter Vera, born 1915.

Sverdlov's brother, Venyamin (1886–1939), emigrated to the USA to become a banker, returning to Russia in 1917,  where he was appointed head of the Road Research Institute. He was arrested on 13 October 1938, accused of belonging to the counter-revolutionary terrorist organisation, and shot on 16 April 1939.
Sverdlov's sister, Sofia (1883–1951), worked as a doctor married a businessman, Leonid Averbakh, and had two children, a son Leopold, who was shot in 1937, and a daughter, Ida, who married Genrikh Yagoda, the future head of the NKVD, and was shot in June 1938. Sofia was arrested in 1937, sentenced to five years exile in Orenburg, then was arrested again and sentenced to eight years in the gulag. She died in a labour camp in Kolyma.

Legacy
 In a speech on 18 March 1919 Vladimir Lenin praised Sverdlov and his contributions to the revolution. He called Sverdlov "the most perfectly complete type of professional revolutionary."
 The Central School for Soviet and Party Work, housed in the former Merchants House, Moscow was renamed the Sverdlov Communist University shortly after Sverdlov's death.
 The Imperial Russian Navy destroyer leader  (commissioned during 1913) was renamed  during 1923.
 The first ship of the s was also named after him.
 Yekaterinburg, dubbed the "third capital of Russia", as it is ranked third by the size of economy, culture, transportation and tourism, was renamed "Sverdlovsk" in 1924 and returned to its former name in 1991.
 In 1938 a number of Ukrainian settlements as well as the Sverdlov mine (part of Sverdlovantratsyt company in 2010s) were merged into the city of Sverdlovsk, which the Ukrainian government renamed Dovzhansk on 12 May 2016, although the renaming could not be enforced due to the Russo-Ukrainian War.
 A few locations in the former Soviet Union still bear Sverdlov's name, in the Russian Federation and in Kyrgyzstan. Others have been renamed.

See also
Zinovy Peshkov, Yakov's brother
Andrei Sverdlov Yakov's son
Yakov Sverdlov (film)

References

Sources

Slezkine, Yuri (2019). The House of Government. Princeton University Press.

External links

Leon Trotsky: Jacob Sverdlov – 1925 memorial essay
 

1885 births
1919 deaths
Politicians from Nizhny Novgorod
Russian Jews
Old Bolsheviks
Russian communists
People of the Russian Revolution
People of the Russian Civil War
Heads of state of Russia
Soviet politicians
Anti-monarchists
Politicide perpetrators
Regicides of Nicholas II
Russian revolutionaries
Heads of the Communist Party of the Soviet Union
Politburo of the Central Committee of the Communist Party of the Soviet Union members
People of the 1905 Russian Revolution
Jewish socialists
Jewish Soviet politicians
Burials at the Kremlin Wall Necropolis
Deaths from Spanish flu
Infectious disease deaths in Russia